Sidorovo is a rural locality (a village) in Korobitsynskoye Rural Settlement, Syamzhensky District, Vologda Oblast, Russia. The population was 22 as of 2002.

Geography 
Sidorovo is located 50 km southeast of Syamzha (the district's administrative centre) by road. Yezdunya is the nearest rural locality.

References 

Rural localities in Syamzhensky District